Fabien Dao Castellana (born 28 July 1993) is a French professional footballer who plays as a midfielder.

Club career
Born in Saint-Raphaël, Dao Castellana initially played for his local side Fréjus Saint-Raphaël as a youth player, before moving to Nice.

He was the captain of the Nice under-19 team that won the 2011–12 edition of the Coupe Gambardella, the most prestigious youth cup competition in France. On 24 May 2012, he signed his first professional contract for a three-year deal. Dao Castellana made his professional debut on 11 August 2012 in a league match against Ajaccio.

References

External links
 
 

Living people
1993 births
Association football midfielders
French footballers
OGC Nice players
ÉFC Fréjus Saint-Raphaël players
RC Grasse players
Ligue 1 players
Championnat National players
Championnat National 2 players
Championnat National 3 players
France youth international footballers